Stavros S. Anthony (Greek: Σταύρος Αντωνίου) (born January 13, 1957) is an American politician and retired law enforcement officer who is the 37th lieutenant governor of Nevada, since 2023. Anthony won the 2022 Nevada lieutenant governor election, defeating incumbent Democrat Lisa Cano Burkhead. A member of the Republican Party, he served as Member of Las Vegas City Council from 2009 to December 2022. He was appointed Mayor Pro Tem of Las Vegas by Mayor Carolyn Goodman, and served in that capacity from July 2011 to April 2015 and was re-appointed June 8, 2020. Anthony unsuccessfully ran in the 2015 Las Vegas mayoral election.

Early life and education 
Stavros Anthony was born on January 13, 1957. He is a Greek-American whose parents came to the United States from Cyprus in the 1950’s.

He graduated with a bachelor of arts in Criminal Justice from Wayne State University in 1980. In 1987, Anthony graduated with a master of arts in Political Science from the University of Nevada Las Vegas. In 1999, he received his Ph.D. in Sociology from University of Nevada Las Vegas. He has also attended the University of Louisville and the FBI National Academy in Quantico, Virginia.

Personal life 
Anthony is of Greek descent and grew up a member of the Greek Orthodox Church. Anthony was a past member and president of the Board of Directors for St. John Greek Orthodox Church at Las Vegas. He is married for 41 years. He also has two daughters who are both graduates of the University of Nevada, Reno.

References 

1957 births
21st-century American politicians
American people of Cypriot descent
American people of Greek descent
Greek Orthodox Christians from the United States
Las Vegas City Council members
Lieutenant Governors of Nevada
Living people
Nevada Republicans
Politicians from Las Vegas
University of Nevada, Las Vegas alumni